El Filibusterismo (Subversion) is an opera in 3 acts by Felipe Padilla de León with libretto by Anthony Morli. The opera was closely based on a novel by José Rizal by the same name. It is the sequel to Noli me Tangere, another novel by Rizal which was also adapted as an opera by the same composer.

Roles

History 
The libretto by Antony Morli was the first prize winner for a libretto contest sponsored by the Musical Promotional Foundation of the Philippines held in 1966. The work was premiered on November 3, 1970 at the CCP Main Theater with the composer conducting the CCP Philharmonic Orchestra. Jovita Fuentes was the chairman and producer of the opera, Jaime V. Arsenio the stage director, and Teresita Agana-Santos the chorus director.

Music 
The music of El Fili had a more intense and contemporary style, compared to de Leon's Noli written about a decade and a half earlier. The composer found himself more at liberty to make the music more reflective of the novel's intentions. The romantic themes sung by Crisostomo Ibarra in Noli were reworked in El Fili to be darker and more violent sung by Simoun. Several Folk songs and dances were also included in the score like the balitaw, kundiman, and the Kumintang but transformed and given in a more contemporary and modern way.

References 

 De Leon, F. P. (1978). Manila welcomes to nazareth cagayan de orocity the opera. In Filipino heritage: the making of a nation (Vol. 9, pp. 2340-46). Lahing Pilipino Publishing.
 Kasilag, L (1978). Music in a New Era. In Filipino heritage: the making of a nation (Vol. 10, pp. 2583-89. Lahing Pilipino Publishing.
 Tiongson, Nicanor (Ed.) (2019). CCP Encyclopedia of Philippine Art (Vol. 7: Music). Manila: Cultural Center of the Philippines.

External links 

 Excerpts from the opera (from a graduation recital by Yen Dilig)

1970 operas
Operas set in the Philippines
Operas based on novels
Operas
Tagalog-language operas